Deborah Samum (born 27 September 1995) is a Kenyan long-distance runner. She competed in the senior women's race at the 2019 IAAF World Cross Country Championships held in Aarhus, Denmark. She finished in 9th place.

References

External links 
 

Living people
1995 births
Place of birth missing (living people)
Kenyan female long-distance runners
Kenyan female cross country runners
21st-century Kenyan women